Bruce Hall is a legally blind photographer and parent of twins with severe autism.  Some of his work is stored in the Library of Congress.  Hall has stated that he takes pictures in order to be able to see the world more clearly.

Hall has about 5% normal eyesight and severe nystagmus. Fast accurate focusing is his number one priority, and he uses many unique workarounds to achieve the ability to take pictures.  Hall's favorite photography subjects are underwater photography, nature photography, and pictures of his twin boys.  He strongly advocates for awareness for the challenges surrounding severe autism.

Immersed
Immersed: Our Experience With Autism is a book written by Bruce and Valerie Hall about their children with severe autism.  Jill Escher in a review wrote that they took "the Carrie Fisher approach and rather than trivializing or minimizing the tragic dimensions of their boys’ disorders or pretending to speak for all with “autism,” the talented duo steadfastly tell their own truth."  Psychologist David Royko wrote about how the book focuses on the difficulties of severe autism, and that it was good for politicians and policy makers.  However, the book also discusses the love and joy of their family.  Advocate Amy S.F. Lutz also noted that the book portrays the happy moments, and the difficulties of severe autism.

Publications with Valerie Hall
Immersed: Our Experience With Autism. Visual Summit, 2016.

References

External links
Hall's website

American photographers
American blind people
Blind photographers
Living people
Year of birth missing (living people)